Archibald Samuel Osborne (1869 – 1913) was a Scottish footballer who played in the Football League for Notts County. He was unfortunate to feature on the losing side for the club in the 1891 FA Cup Final, having also finished as runner-up in the 1890 Scottish Cup Final with Vale of Leven. He was still playing for the Magpies in the 1893–94 season when they reached the showpiece event again, but this time did not take part as the club claimed victory (his former Vale of Leven teammate Daniel Bruce was on the field). He later returned to Scotland for a short spell with Clyde.

References

1869 births
1913 deaths
Scottish footballers
People from Bonhill
Footballers from West Dunbartonshire
English Football League players
Scottish Football League players
Vale of Leven F.C. players
Clyde F.C. players
Notts County F.C. players
Association football wing halves
FA Cup Final players